Malcolm Gregory Ali Floyd (né Seabron; born December 19, 1972) is a former American football wide receiver who played in the National Football League (NFL) for the Houston/Tennessee Oilers (1994–1997) and St. Louis Rams (1997).

From 2011 to 2013, Floyd had been the varsity football coach and had taught mathematics at C. K. McClatchy High School in Sacramento, California.

Floyd's younger brother, Malcom, was also a wide receiver in the NFL. Floyd was allowed to name his younger sibling, and he named him after himself—their father introduced the spelling difference.

See also
List of family relations in American football

References

1972 births
Living people
Players of American football from San Francisco
American football wide receivers
Fresno State Bulldogs football players
Houston Oilers players
Tennessee Oilers players
St. Louis Rams players